Inowrocław is a city in central Poland with a total population of 70,713 in December 2021. It is situated in the Kuyavian-Pomeranian Voivodeship since 1999, previously in the Bydgoszcz Voivodeship (1975–1998). It is one of the largest and most historically significant cities within Kuyavia.

The town is the 5th largest agglomeration in its voivodeship, and is a major railway junction, where the west–east line (Poznań–Toruń) crosses the Polish Coal Trunk-Line from Chorzów to Gdynia.

History 

The town was first mentioned in 1185 as Novo Wladislaw, possibly in honor of Władysław I Herman or after the settlers from Włocławek. Many inhabitants of Włocławek settled in Inowrocław fleeing flooding. In 1236, the settlement was renamed Juveni Wladislawia. It was incorporated two years later by Casimir Konradowic. In medieval Latin records, the town was recorded as Juniwladislavia. As a result of the fragmentation of Poland into smaller duchies, after 1230 Inowrocław was the capital of the Duchy of Kuyavia, and from 1267 to 1364 it was the capital of the Duchy of Inowrocław, before it became part and capital of Poland's Inowrocław Voivodeship, which covered northern Kuyavia along with the Dobrzyń Land. The voivodeship later also formed part of the larger Greater Poland Province of the Polish Crown. Inowrocław was a royal city of the Polish Crown. The town's development was aided by the discovery of extensive salt deposits in the vicinity during the 15th century.

It was an important city of late medieval Poland. In 1321, a Polish-Teutonic trial was held in Inowrocław regarding the Teutonic occupation of Gdańsk Pomerania, while the city itself was occupied by the Teutonic Knights from 1332 to 1337. King Casimir III the Great often stayed in the city, and in 1337 he held a meeting with King John of Bohemia in the local castle. A strong garrison was located in the city during the Polish-Teutonic War (1409–1411), and it was the main base of King Władysław II Jagiełło after his victory in the Battle of Grunwald.

Inowrocław was occupied and plundered by Swedish troops during the Deluge in the 1650s, and was annexed to the Kingdom of Prussia in February 1772 during the First Partition of Poland and added to the Netze District. Following the Franco-Prussian Treaty in July 1807, Inowrocław was transferred to the newly created Duchy of Warsaw, which was a client state of the French Empire. The city was a headquarters for Napoleon Bonaparte during his 1812 invasion of Russia. Following the Congress of Vienna in 1815, Inowrocław (as first Inowraclaw and later Inowrazlaw) was transferred back to Prussia as part of the Grand Duchy of Posen. Initially, until 1838 the mayors were still Poles, then Germans. Despite Germanisation attempts, the city was an important center of the Polish resistance during the partitions. It flourished after the establishment of a railway junction in 1872 and a spa in 1875. The city and the region were given the Germanized name Hohensalza on December 5, 1904. It was electrified in 1908.

Interbellum
After the end of World War I, in November 1918, Poland regained independence and Polish insurgents re-captured the city in January 1919. Restoration to the re-established sovereign Polish state was confirmed in the Treaty of Versailles (which came into effect on January 10, 1920), and the historic name Inowrocław was restored. High unemployment resulting from trade embargoes led to violent confrontations between workers and the police in 1926 and hunger strikes killed 20 in 1930. Inowrocław was part of Poznań Voivodeship until 1925, when it became an independent urban district. This district was briefly assigned to Great Pomerania during the reform of Polish regional administration just before World War II.

World War II

Captured by the German 4th Army during the invasion of Poland on September 11, 1939, Inowrocław was again renamed Hohensalza and initially administered under the military district (Militärbezirk) of Posen before being incorporated into Nazi Germany first as part of the Reichsgau of Posen (1939) and then as part of Reichsgau Wartheland (1939–1945).

The Einsatzgruppe IV entered the city on September 12–15, 1939, to commit various atrocities against Poles. Poles arrested during the Intelligenzaktion were held in the local prison and in a transit camp, and afterwards mostly murdered in the prison or in the nearby Gniewkowo forest, while some were deported to Nazi concentration camps. In a large massacre, on the night of October 22–23, 1939, the Germans murdered 56 Poles in the prison, including numerous teachers. Families of the victims were expelled, alike local Polish activists and craftsmen, whose workshops were handed over to German colonists in accordance to the Nazi Lebensraum policy. In total, the Germans expelled a few thousand Poles from the city, including over 2,900 already in 1939. Several Poles from Inowrocław were also murdered by the Russians in the large Katyn massacre in April–May 1940. Multiple local members of the Home Army, a major Polish resistance organization, were imprisoned and murdered by the Germans in the prison camp in Żabikowo in 1944–1945.

Between 1940 and 1945, Hohensalza was used as a resettlement camp for Poles and an internment camp for Soviet, French and British prisoners of war. Germany also operated a forced labour camp in the city.

Recent period
Inowrocław returned to Poland and its original name following the arrival of the Soviet Red Army on January 21, 1945. The last German air raid occurred on April 4, 1945, when a single aircraft dropped four fragmentation bombs and fired on travelers waiting at the Inowrocław train platform. Between 1950 and 1998, the town was part of Bydgoszcz Voivodeship, but the 1999 reforms left it part of Kuyavian-Pomeranian Voivodeship.

Population 

 1970: 54,900
 1980: 66,100
 1990: 77,700
 2000: 79,400
 2004: 77,647
 2014: 74,803
 2019: 72,561

Landmarks and monuments 

 The romanesque church of the St Virgin Mary, dating back to the end of the 12th century or beginning of the 13th century, built from granite stones and brick. In 1834 it was destroyed by fire, and partially reconstructed in the 1950s. Since 13 July 2008 the St Virgin Mary's church is also the Minor Basilica (in Polish: Bazylika Mniejsza Imienia Najświętszej Maryi Panny)
 The Gothic church of St. Nicholas, first built in the middle of the 13th century, the present church was built after damage in the 15th century, and rebuilt in the 17th century
 The Neo-Romanesque church of the Annunciation to the Virgin Mary, built between 1898 and 1900, consecrated in 1902, the largest church in the city, with an imposing  tower. The north side of the transept collapsed in a construction disaster in 1909 and was not rebuilt until 1929.
 The garrison church of St. Barbara and St. Maurice
 The house of Czabańscy family from 
 The Inowrocław Synagogue
 Houses, hotel "Bast" and spa buildings from the turn of the 19th and 20th centuries

Districts and neighborhoods 

 Śródmieście
 Stare Miasto
 Nowe Osiedle
 Osiedle Bydgoskie
 Osiedle Toruńskie
 Osiedle Piastowskie
 Uzdrowisko
 Miechowiczki
 Osiedle Bajka
 Rąbin
 Rąbinek
 Mątwy
 Szymborze
 Solno
 Kruśliwiec
 Osiedle Zdrojowe
 Osiedle Kolejowe
 Cegielnia
 Osiedle Sady
 Osiedle Okrężek
 Osiedle Lotnicze

Sport 
The most popular sports in the city are basketball and football. Notable teams:
 Noteć Inowrocław – men's basketball team, formerly playing in the Polish Basketball League, the country's top division.
 Sportino Inowrocław – men's basketball team, which replaced SSA Notec, but in the 1st league.
 Goplania Inowrocław – men's football team, they are playing in 4th league.
 Cuiavia Inowrocław – men's football team, they are playing in 4th league.

Notable people

 Adolph Salomonsohn (1831–1919), banker
 Berthold Fernow (1837–1908), historian
 Bernhard Fernow (1851–1923), chief of the USDA's Division of Forestry 
 Jan Kasprowicz (1860–1926), poet, playwright, critic and translator
 Leopold Loeske (1865–1935), bryologist
 Gus Edwards (1879–1945), musician
 Alfred Herrmann (1879–1960), politician
 Gustav Heistermann von Ziehlberg (1898–1945), German general and resistance fighter
 Hans Jeschonnek (1899–1943), Luftwaffe general 
 Arthur Sodtke (1901–1944), resistance fighter
 Justus Frantz (born 1944), musician
 Wojciech Polak (born 1964), Roman Catholic archbishop
 Tomasz Wasilewski (born 1980), film director and screenwriter
 Krzysztof Szubarga (born 1984), basketball player
 Marcin Mroziński (born 1985), actor, singer
 Tomasz Ziętek (born 1989), actor

References

External links 

 www.ino-online.pl/
 www.zschie.kujawy.com.pl
 www.ikmedia.pl
 www.dawny-inowroclaw.info
 www.ino.webpark.pl
 

Cities and towns in Kuyavian-Pomeranian Voivodeship
Inowrocław County
Spa towns in Poland
Poznań Voivodeship (1921–1939)
Pomeranian Voivodeship (1919–1939)